Canton Valley (commonly known simply as Canton) is a village and census-designated place (CDP) in the town of Canton in Hartford County, Connecticut, United States. The population was 1,580 at the 2010 census. As of the 2017 census the population was 1,489.

Geography
Canton Valley ("Canton") is located in the southern part of the town of Canton. U.S. Route 202 and U.S. Route 44 run in a concurrency as the Albany Turnpike, the main road through the center of the village, leading east to Avon and west to Torrington (US 202) and northwest to Winsted (US 44). Connecticut Route 177 (Lovely Street) leads south from Canton Valley to Unionville. Dowd Avenue leads southwest from Canton Valley to Collinsville, the largest community in the town of Canton.

Demographics
As of the census of 2000, there were 1,565 people, 749 households, and 409 families residing in the CDP. The racial makeup of the CDP was 96.93% White, 0.58% African American, 0.32% Asian, 1.09% from other races, and 1.09% from two or more races. Hispanic or Latino of any race were 1.15% of the population.

There were 749 households, out of which 25.0% had children under the age of 18 living with them, 43.4% were married couples living together, 9.3% had a female householder with no husband present, and 45.3% were non-families. 40.5% of all households were made up of individuals, and 18.8% had someone living alone who was 65 years of age or older.  The average household size was 2.09 and the average family size was 2.84.

In the CDP, the population was spread out, with 22.2% under the age of 18, 3.9% from 18 to 24, 33.0% from 25 to 44, 24.3% from 45 to 64, and 16.5% who were 65 years of age or older.  The median age was 40 years. For every 100 females, there were 88.1 males.  For every 100 females age 18 and over, there were 82.2 males.

The median income for a household in the CDP was $46,543, and the median income for a family was $64,028. Males had a median income of $45,938 versus $32,298 for females. The per capita income for the CDP was $25,206.  About 6.6% of families and 7.4% of the population were below the poverty line, including 7.8% of those under age 18 and 1.7% of those age 65 or over.

References

Canton, Connecticut
Census-designated places in Hartford County, Connecticut
Census-designated places in Connecticut
Villages in Connecticut